Tahj-Michael Bell (born May 12, 1991) is a Bermudian former footballer who played as a goalkeeper.

Club career
In August 2013, Bell made his debut for English non-league side Hitchin Town.

In late December 2014, Bell signed for Southern Division One Central side Aylesbury United on loan as cover for the injured Jack Sillitoe.
Bell left Hitchin in summer 2015.

International career
Bell made his debut for Bermuda in a November 2011 World Cup qualification match against Barbados and earned a total of two caps, representing his country in two FIFA World Cup qualification matches.

Personal life
His sister is Cheyra Bell, who plays for Bermuda women's national football team. His late father Derek was also a football player.

References

External links
 
 Profile - Hitchin Town
 Profile - Aylesbury Utd

1991 births
Living people
Association football goalkeepers
Bermudian footballers
Bermuda international footballers
USL League Two players
Southern Football League players
Bermuda Hogges F.C. players
Eccleshill United F.C. players
Hitchin Town F.C. players
Aylesbury United F.C. players
Bermudian expatriate footballers
Bermudian expatriate sportspeople in England
Expatriate footballers in England